Léon Laleau (3 August 1892 –7 September 1979) was a Haitian writer, politician, and diplomat. Laleau is still recognized "as one of the most brilliant writers of his time". He received several international awards, such as the Edgar Allan Poe Prize in 1962. He was also a member of the Ronsard Academy, the Académie Méditerranéenne (Mediterranean Academy). He was recipient of numerous honors, including The Legion of Honor rank of Grand Officer (France), Saint Grégoire (Vatican), and Palms Académique, Arts et Lettres rank of Commandeur (France).

Born in Port-au-Prince, Laleau held two degrees, one in law and another in letters and sciences. As a politician, he was appointed Foreign Minister and Minister of National Education, Agriculture, and Public Works. He served in numerous diplomatic positions, such as Chief of Diplomatic Missions in Rome, London, Paris, Santiago, and Lima and Special Mission Ambassador to Panama, Cuba, the United Nations, and UNESCO. He was a signer of the 24 July 1934 accord which ended the United States' occupation of Haiti.

Selected works 

 Jusqu'au Bord (1916) - novel
 La Danse des Vagues (1919) - novel
 A Voix Basse (1920) - compilation of poems
 La Flèche au Cœur (1926) - compilation of poems
 Le Rayon des Jupes (1928) - compilation of poems
 Abréviations (1928) - compilation of poems
 Musique Nègre (1931) - poem
 Le Choc (1932) - novel
 Ondes Courtes (1933) - poem
 La Pluie et le Beau Temps - play
 Le Tremplin - play

Notes

References

 

1892 births
1979 deaths
Ambassadors of Haiti to Italy
Ambassadors of Haiti to the United Kingdom
Ambassadors of Haiti to France
Ambassadors of Haiti to Chile
Ambassadors of Haiti to Peru
Ambassadors of Haiti to Panama
Ambassadors of Haiti to Cuba
Permanent Delegates of Haiti to UNESCO
Permanent Representatives of Haiti to the United Nations
20th-century Haitian dramatists and playwrights
Haitian male dramatists and playwrights
Haitian male novelists
Haitian male poets
Foreign Ministers of Haiti
Government ministers of Haiti
People from Port-au-Prince
20th-century Haitian poets
20th-century Haitian novelists
20th-century male writers